The International Association for Ambulatory Surgery
was formed in 1995 when clinicians from several countries who were interested in ambulatory surgery (otherwise known as day surgery) came together to form the organisation which is run as a charity registered in Belgium. It aims to promote ambulatory surgery around the world and is run by an active General Assembly formed by representatives from each of the member countries. They organise a biennial International Congress in Ambulatory Surgery and have an electronic journal Ambulatory Surgery which is available online.

References

External links 
Official website
Ambulatory Surgery journal

Surgical organizations
International medical and health organizations
Medical and health organisations based in Belgium